The Bells of Nagasaki is a 1950 film adaptation of the 1949 book of the same name by Takashi Nagai. It was directed by Hideo Ōba and was released September 23, 1950.

Plot
The film portrays the experiences of Takashi Nagai as a survivor of the atomic bombing of Nagasaki.

Cast
Masao Wakahara as Takashi Nagai
Yumeji Tsukioka as Midori Nagai
Keiko Tsushima as Sachiko Yamada
Osamu Takizawa as Professor Asakura
Kōji Mitsui as Yamashita

Production
The film was heavily censored.

Theme song
The theme song "The Bells of Nagasaki" by Yuji Koseki proved immensely popular.

References

External links
 

1950 films
1950s Japanese films
1950s Japanese-language films
Japanese biographical films
1950s biographical films
Films set in the 1940s
Films about the atomic bombings of Hiroshima and Nagasaki
Films set in Nagasaki
Shochiku films
Films based on non-fiction books